Extended-hours trading (or electronic trading hours, ETH) is stock trading that happens either before or after the trading day of a stock exchange, i.e., pre-market trading or after-hours trading.

After-hours trading is the name for buying and selling of securities when the major markets are closed. Since 1985, the regular trading hours for major exchanges in the United States, such as the New York Stock Exchange and the Nasdaq stock market, have been from 9:30 a.m. to 4:00 p.m. Eastern Time (ET). Pre-market trading occurs from 4:00 a.m. to 9:30 a.m. ET, although the majority of the volume and liquidity come to the pre-market at 8:00AM ET. After-hours trading on a day with a normal session occurs from 4:00 p.m. to 8:00 p.m. ET. Market makers and specialists generally do not participate in after-hours trading, which can limit liquidity.

Trading outside regular hours is not a new phenomenon but used to be limited to high-net-worth investors and institutional investors like mutual funds. The emergence of private trading systems, known as electronic communication networks (ECNs), has allowed individual investors to participate in after-hours trading. Pre-market trading and after-hours trading is all processed through ECNs including NYSE Arca.

Financial Industry Regulatory Authority (FINRA) members who voluntarily enter quotations during the after-hours session are required to comply with all applicable limit order protection and display rules (e.g., the Manning rule and the SEC order handling rules).

See also
 Trading day
 Stock exchange halts and suspensions
 List of stock exchanges
 List of stock exchange trading hours

References

External links

Share trading